Octacalcium phosphate (sometimes referred to as OCP) is a calcium phosphate with a formula Ca8H2(PO4)6⋅5H2O.  OCP may be a precursor to tooth enamel, dentine, and bones.

OCP is a precursor of hydroxylapatite (HAP), an inorganic biomineral that is important in bone growth. OCP has been suggested as a replacement for HAP in bone grafts.

Properties
Boiling water decomposes OCP into hydroxyapatite and dicalcium phosphate.
Both thermal and hydrothermal treatments sometimes yield apatitic single crystal pseudomorphs after OCP, the c-axes being parallel to the c of the original OCP.

OCP has the lattice constants a = 19.7 Å, b = 9.59 Å, c =6.87 Å, α = β = 90.7° and γ' = 71.8°, slightly different from those of hydroxyapatite. OCP has a strong crystal twinning tendency. The average crystal size of OCP is 13.5 ± 0.2 nm.

Synthesis
It can be prepared by treating calcium acetate with sodium acid phosphate solution.

References

Sources 
  
  
  
  
  
  
  
  

Calcium compounds
Phosphates
Dental enamel
Bones